The list of ship launches in 1750 includes a chronological list of some ships launched in 1750.


References

1750
Ship launches